Neil Breen (born November 23, 1958) is an American filmmaker and actor. Since 2005, he has written, directed, independently produced, and starred in six theatrical feature films. Breen's films have garnered a cult following for their low-budget production values, acting, writing, and editing.

Life and career
Neil Breen grew up on the East Coast of the United States, and developed an interest in film and filmmaking at an early age. He studied architecture and initially became a licensed architect in California. He gained a small following after releasing his first film, Double Down. In the years that followed, Breen continued working as an architect as a means to finance his next film: I Am Here.... Now. This second feature proved to be a breakout hit, reintroducing familiar motifs and garnering Breen "a lot of attention." Since then, he has established a reputation as a cult amateur filmmaker.

Film 
Breen writes, produces, directs, and stars in each of his own films. The characters he portrays hold advanced and often superhuman abilities and use them in grandiose struggles against corrupt forces and institutions. Fateful Findings features Breen as a hacker imbued with supernatural powers by a magical stone he found as a child, who uses his skills to expose government and corporate corruption, while in Double Down he plays a rogue government super-agent.

In other films, his protagonist is a god-like, messianic, or otherwise chosen figure; Pass Thru, for example, has Breen playing a messianic entity who arrives from the future to wipe out 300 million "bad people" to usher in a new era of peace. Breen has said that his films have a "sense of social responsibility" and reflect the "mystical or paranormal side of life."

Some critics have compared Breen's films to outsider art. Breen's third film, Fateful Findings, was compared to Wiseau's The Room by the former film's North American distributor Panorama Entertainment. Breen's fifth feature film, Twisted Pair, was released in October 2018. In March 2019, Breen confirmed that he would direct a Twisted Pair sequel. On October 3, 2022, Breen confirmed that filming on his latest project had wrapped via his Twitter account. On December 16, 2022, Breen confirmed the title of his sequel to Twisted Pair is Cade: The Tortured Crossing. In February 2023, Cade: The Tortured Crossing won the award for "Best Fantasy Film" at the Hollywood Reel Independent Film Festival, before its world premiere on February 25, 2023, at the Regal Cinemas L.A. Live.

Influence
His first feature film, Double Down, was featured on RedLetterMedia's Best of the Worst online series, whilst Fateful Findings was covered by  RedLetterMedia along with other film critics on YouTube. Since then, Breen's films have been picked up by arthouse theaters and film festivals, including the 2012 "Butt-Numb-A-Thon" and the 2013 Seattle International Film Festival. In Jim Vorel's 2014 list of the 100 best B movies for Paste magazine, Breen's film I Am Here.... Now was ranked 21st, with Vorel mentioning that Breen could one day earn a place in the "terrible movie hall of fame" alongside Ed Wood and Tommy Wiseau.

Filmography

Film

Accolades

References

Works cited

External links 
 
 

American architects
American film directors
American film producers
American male film actors
American male screenwriters
Living people
Place of birth missing (living people)
1958 births